Inner-Vikna (sometimes Indre Vikna) is the largest of the three major islands in the municipality of Nærøysund in Trøndelag county, Norway. The  island is located in the eastern part of the municipality and it includes the village of Rørvik, the administrative centre of Vikna.

Norwegian County Road 770 runs across the island, and also passing by Rørvik Airport, Ryum, then it continues over the Nærøysund Bridge and Marøysund Bridge to connect the island to the mainland. The relatively flat and barren island is separated from the mainland by the Nærøysundet strait.

See also
List of islands of Norway

References

Islands of Trøndelag
Nærøysund
Vikna